Under Cover is the third solo album of Joe Lynn Turner, released in 1997. It mostly consists of covers of artists that had a great influence on Turner. On the Japanese version of the album, "Gimme Some Lovin" and "I'm Your Man" are two separate tracks instead of one.

Track listing

Production notes
 Recorded and mixed at Unique Recording Studios in NYC
 Mixed and engineered by Fernando Krai
 Mastered at Masterdisk by Scott Hull
 Produced by Bob Held, Fernando Krai and Joe Lynn Turner
 Executive producer: Max Wexler

Personnel
Joe Lynn Turner: Lead vocals, Backing vocals on 1,2,3,5,6,7,9,10,11,12
Tony Bruno: Guitar, Second solo on 13, Backing vocals on 5
Greg Smith: Bass
John O'Reilly: Drums
Gary Corbett: Keyboards

Guest Musicians

Al Pitrelli: Guitar solo 1,12
Karl Cochran: Guitar solo on 13, Backing vocals on 2,5
Sandi Saraya: Backing vocals on 5,7,9
Peter Baron: Backing vocals on 6,11,12
Nancy Bender: Backing vocals on 3,4,10
Kaz Kojima: Backing vocals on 2,5
Katie Mac: Backing vocals on 1
Dina Miller: Backing vocals on 3,4,10
Steve Murphy: Backing vocals on 6,11,12
Janet Raines: Backing vocals on 5,7,9

Horns Section

Don Harris: Trumpet on 6
Bill Harris: Saxophone on 6
John Fumalosi: Trombone on 6
Mark Wexler: Percussion on 1,10,11
Bob Held: Percussion on 10,11
Louie Appel: Percussion on 4

References

Joe Lynn Turner albums
1997 albums
Shrapnel Records albums
Covers albums